Elena Baltacha was the defending champion, but chose not to participate.
Eleni Daniilidou defeated Olga Govortsova 1–6, 6–4, 6–2 in the final to win the tournament.

Seeds

Main draw

Finals

Top half

Bottom half

References
Main Draw
Qualifying Draw

Aegon Trophy - Singles
2011 Women's Singles